Top Model Norge was a Norwegian reality television show airing on TV3, based on Tyra Banks' America's Next Top Model.

Judges

Cycles

See also
 Top Model (Scandinavia)

External links
Official site (Norwegian)
Norway's Next Top Model at the Internet Movie Database

References

 
2005 Norwegian television series debuts
2006 Norwegian television series endings
2006 Norwegian television series debuts
TV3 (Norway) original programming
2000s Norwegian television series
Norwegian reality television series
Norwegian television series based on American television series